Mosbah Sanaï (born 26 March 1991) is a Tunisian handball player for Steaua București and the Tunisian national team.

He competed for the Tunisian national team at the 2013 World Championship in Spain, where the Tunisian team finished eleventh.

Honours

National team
African Championship
 Winner: 2012 Morocco (27 goals)
 Runners-up: 2014 Algeria

Junior World Championship
 Bronze Medalist: 2011 Greece (36 goals)

Club
Tunisia National League
 Winner: 2011
Tunisia National Cup
 Winner: 2010
IHF Super Globe
 Bronze Medalist: 2013 Qatar
African Super Cup
 Winner: 2013 Sousse
 Runners-up: 2011 Yaoundé
African Champions League
 Winner: 2010 Casablanca
 Runners-up: 2011 Kaduna
Asian Champions League
 Winner: 2013 Doha
African Cup Winners' Cup
 Winner: 2012 Tunis
 Bronze medalist: 2013 Hammamet
Arab Championship of Champions
 Bronze medalist: 2013 Saudi Arabia
Gulf Club Championship
 Winner: 2014 Saudi Arabia
 Bronze medalist: 2013 Bahrain

References

1991 births
Living people
Tunisian male handball players
Tunisian expatriate sportspeople in France
Tunisian expatriate sportspeople in Romania
Tunisian expatriate sportspeople in Qatar
Tunisian expatriate sportspeople in the United Arab Emirates
Expatriate handball players
People from Medenine Governorate
Mediterranean Games medalists in handball
Mediterranean Games silver medalists for Tunisia
Competitors at the 2018 Mediterranean Games
CSA Steaua București (handball) players
Competitors at the 2013 Mediterranean Games